Mississippi Rising - The Concert in Support of the Hurricane Katrina Recovery Efforts (2005) telethon (2 DVD set) was quickly put together after Hurricane Katrina had devastated the Gulf Coast of the United States between 23 and 30 August 2005. This three-hour concert and telethon was broadcast live on MSNBC throughout North America on 1 October 2005.  It was marketed commercially as a 2 DVD set in very limited numbers.  All proceeds have gone to the Mississippi Hurricane Recovery Fund.

Production 
The production was telecast from the University of Mississippi (Oxford, MS) on 1 October 2005; C. M. Tad Smith Coliseum was converted into a television production facility in order to accommodate the media production, telecast, and live concert.   Native Mississippians, Sam Haskell III and Lanny Griffith produced the event.  The event was underwritten by a contribution to the Mississippi Hurricane Recovery Fund by UnitedHealth Group Foundation.

All proceeds went to the Mississippi Hurricane Recovery Fund (www.mississippirecovery.com) or a similar fund in Louisiana administered by Foundations for Recovery, The Hurricane Katrina New Orleans Recovery Fund (www.foundationsforrecovery.org). The event raised in excess of $15 million.

The event featured numerous celebrities backed by a live 50 piece studio orchestra.

After Hurricane Katrina, Whoopi Goldberg and director Penelope Spheeris collaborated to tell the stories of residents of Biloxi, Mississippi for MSNBC's "Mississippi Rising" telethon. Twelve two-three-minute short documentaries aired during the 1 Oct. 2005 broadcast.

Featured celebrities 
Faith Hill, Jason Alexander, Sela Ward, Whoopi Goldberg, Doris Roberts, Macy Gray, Ray Romano, Samuel L. Jackson, Lance Bass, Jean Smart, Marilu Henner, Steve Azar, Kathy Ireland, Delta Burke, Mary Donnelly-Haskell, Kristian Alfonso, Debbie Allen, George W. Bush, Bill Clinton, Gary Collins, Billy Davis Jr., Brett Favre, Gary Grubbs, Deidre Hall, Kathy Ireland, Diana Krall, Lenny Kravitz, Marilyn McCoo, Brian McKnight, Gerald McRaney, Mary Ann Mobley, Gary Morris, Peter Reckell, Greg Rikaart, Joe Scarborough, Melody Thomas Scott, Alison Sweeney, Pam Tillis, Trent Lott, Haley Barbour

Musicians (studio orchestra) 
Musical contractor(s): Bill Hughes, Jack Cooper
Conductor/arranger: Harold Wheeler
Violin: Jackson/Mississippi Symphony members
Viola: Jackson/Mississippi Symphony members
Cello: Jackson/Mississippi Symphony members
Basses: Jackson/Mississippi Symphony members
Saxophones/Woodwinds: Sal Lozano, John Lux, Larry Panella, Jack Cooper, Tom Link
Trumpets: Rick Baptist, David Spencer, Jamey Simmons, Brandon Potts
Trombones: John Mahoney, Brian O'Neill, Steve Suter
Guitar: Steve Gregory
Keyboards: Pat Coil
Bass (amplified): Trey Henry
Drums: Vinnie Colaiuta

Production crew 
Cinematography: Penelope Spheeris
Producer, documentary segment: Hudson Hickman
Editor, documentary segment: Nels Bangerter
Talent escort and production assistant: Wendy Bell
Production assistant: Michael Kettering
Script coordinator: David Lucky
talent assistant:  Jenny Morgan
production assistant:  Tim Reeves
travel coordinator: Christina Tong
transportation coordinator: Bob Maywhort

Media 
 September 28, 2005 – MSNBC will air 'Mississippi Rising' October 1st from 8 p.m. - 11 p.m. ET.
Life Magazine, "Mississippi Rising" Gala Concert To Benefit Recovery Effort
WIREIMAGE, pictures of "Mississippi Rising" concert and T.V. Broadcast, October 1, 2005
Mississippi Rising, Personal passion: Sam Haskell. Variety Magazine, Thursday July 13, 2006, by Anna Stewart
Mississippi Stars Team Up For Benefit Concert, Contactmusic, September 24, 2005

References

External links 
 Mississippi Rising: Concert DVD ASIN: B000OM9F96
 

MSNBC
American telethons
2005 television specials
2000s American television specials